Koyuncu is a Turkish name, meaning "sheep farmer." It may refer to:

People
 Kâzım Koyuncu (1972–2005), Turkish singer-songwriter
 Kemal Koyuncu (born 1985), Turkish runner

Places
 Koyuncu, Göynücek, a village in the district of Göynücek, Amasya Province, Turkey
 Koyuncu, Seyhan, a village in the district of Seyhan, Adana Province, Turkey

See also
 Koyuncular (disambiguation)

Turkish-language surnames